Sulanga Apa Ragena Yavi is a 2016 Sri Lankan Sinhala drama film directed by Nuwan Jayathilake and co-produced by director himself with Maya Nawagaththegama for Nawagaththegama Films. It stars  Priyankara Rathnayake and Suranga Ranawaka in lead roles along with Sujeewa Priyalal and Iranganie Serasinghe. Music composed by Chitral Somapala. It is the 1326th Sri Lankan film in the Sinhala cinema.

The film successfully passed 100 theatrical days.

Plot

Cast
 Priyankara Rathnayake as Edward
 Suranga Ranawaka as Kumari
 Sujeewa Priyalal as Rasika
 Anjana Premarathna as Duminda
 Sampath Jayaweera as Ranji
 Iranganie Serasinghe as Granny
 Sanath Hennayaka as Nandapala
 Sisira Thadikara as Farmer
 Lanka Bandaranayake as Farmer's wife
 Wasantha Muhandiram as Podi Vijay
 Denushka Weerapperuma as Aunt
 Chamal Ranasinghe as Apple salesman
 Dinal Asanka as Kapuwa
 Wimal Kumara de Costa as Elder father
 Bandula Vithanage as Monk
 Semini Hennayaka as Nihansa
 Praween Katukithula as Vihanga
 Sudam Katukithula as Kasun
 Dayadeva Edirisinghe as Policeman

Songs
The film has only one song sung by Himasha Manupriya.

Production
The film has been done on a tight budget. It was shot in around 15 days.

Awards and Screening
The film had a special autumn screening with director Q&A session on October 16 at Munich in Germany. The film has won several awards at international film festivals.

 49th WorldFest Houston International Film Festival 2016 - Remi Award 
 18th London Asian Film Festival 2016 - Screened
 Cinekid screening club in Netherlands - Competitive section
 Cinema Di Ringhiera in Italy - Screened
 Cinema De Mando in Rome - Screened
 Indian Film Festival in Melbourne - Screened
 European Children's Film Association - Sold in European film market
 Toronto World International Film Festival - Screened
 Held special shows in Munich in Germany, Verona, Brescia and Milano Italy, Sidney, Perth and Melbourne in Australia

References

External links
 
 Sulanga Apa Ragena Yavi on YouTube
 சர்வதேசத்தின் கவனத்தை வென்ற இலங்கைத் திரைப்படம் ‘Sulanga Apa Regana Yaavi – The Wind Beneath Us’
 ගින්නෙන් උපන් සීතලට පසුව “සුළඟ අප රැගෙන යාවි”
 නුවන් ජයතිලකගේ “සුළඟ අප රැගෙන යාවි”
 Best debut films in competition announced

2016 films
2010s Sinhala-language films